Gamma Leonis b is an extrasolar planet located 125.5 light years away in the constellation Leo, orbiting the giant star Gamma Leonis.

Discovery
On November 6, 2009, a planetary companion around primary star Gamma1 Leonis has been announced. Moreover, radial velocity variations would also hint two strong signals at 8.5 and 1340 days. The former periodicity is likely due to stellar pulsation, whereas the latter could be indicative of the presence of an additional planetary companion with 2.14 Jupiter masses, moderate eccentricity (e=0.13) and located at 2.6 Astronomical Units away from the giant star. Nevertheless, the nature of such a signal is still unclear and further investigations are needed to confirm or rule out an additional substellar companion.

Characteristics
The planet has a minimum mass of 8.78 Jupiter masses. The true mass, as with the majority of other extrasolar planets discovered by the radial velocity method, is unknown.

References

Leo (constellation)
Giant planets
Exoplanets discovered in 2009
Exoplanets detected by radial velocity